Peter Bay is Music Director of the Austin Symphony Orchestra.

Life
He graduated from the University of Maryland and the Peabody Institute.

He has previously been Music Director and Conductor of the Britt Festival Orchestra in Oregon, Music Director of the Erie Philharmonic, the Annapolis Symphony Orchestra, and the Breckenridge Music Festival, and has held conducting posts with the Rochester Philharmonic Orchestra, the Richmond Symphony, and the St. Paul Chamber Orchestra. He has been guest conductor for over seventy other orchestras around the United States.

Awards
 1980 Baltimore Symphony Orchestra Young Conductors Competition
 1987 Leopold Stokowski Competition sponsored by the American Symphony Orchestra

References

External links
"Peter Bay’s lecture brings Mendelsson’s compositions to life", Lake Travis View, October 21, 2009, Charles McClure

American male conductors (music)
Living people
University of Maryland, College Park alumni
Peabody Institute alumni
Texas classical music
Year of birth missing (living people)
21st-century American conductors (music)
21st-century American male musicians